The Spitzen Leichtathletik Luzern (English: Top Athletics Lucerne) is an annual track and field meet that takes place in Lucerne, Switzerland. First held in 1987, the meeting usually takes place in July at Stadion Allmend.

Meeting records

Men

Women

See also
Athletissima
Weltklasse Zürich

References

External links
SpitzenLeichtathletik.ch - official website
Men's meeting records
Women's meeting records

European Athletic Association meetings
Lucerne
Athletics in Switzerland
Recurring sporting events established in 1987
1987 establishments in Switzerland